Joaquin Maria López de Andújar y Cánovas del Castillo (born September 13, 1942) was the diocesan bishop of Getafe, Spain from December 19, 2004 to September 13, 2017.

Biography 
Castillo was ordained as a priest on 30 November 1968. He was ordained as a bishop on 6 May 2001. After the demise of his predecessor, on 24 February 2004, he was chosen by the Colegio de Consultores Administrador diocesano (College of Consultors diocesan administrator) on 25 February 2004, and was later appointed as bishop of Getafe on 29 October 2004.

He resigned when becoming 75 years old, as regulated by the Canon law of the Catholic Church.

References

External links 
 

1942 births
Bishops of Getafe
Living people